The 1st Siklab (Spark) Sports Youth Awards, or the 1st Phoenix Siklab Sports Youth Awards, for sponsorship reasons, is an awarding ceremony bestowed upon young Philippine sports personalities aged 17 and below who are excelled in different local and international sports competitions. The Siklab Sports Youth Awards is organized by the PSC–POC Media Group, an organization composed of esteemed sportswriters, both print and online who are covering the Philippine Sports Commission (PSC), the Philippine Olympic Committee (POC), the National Sports Associations (NSAs), and the National Athletes and Teams beat assignments, and it is headed by June V. Navarro of the Philippine Daily Inquirer.

The inaugural edition of the yearly event was originally scheduled for April 2018, but it was later moved to June 27, 2018, set to be held at the Century Park Hotel Grand Ballroom, Malate, Manila.

Honor roll

Sports Idol Award
The award was given to Olympic silver medalists Mansueto Velasco and Hidilyn Diaz who serves as an inspiration to young Filipino sportsmen.

POC Young Heroes Award
The Young Heroes award were given to 24 young athletes who shined in different local and international tourneys/

POC Super Kids Award
The POC Super Kids Award were given to outstanding young athletes that has competed in collegiate sports competitions including the University Athletic Association of the Philippines and the National Collegiate Athletic Association, as well as the Philippine National Games.

PSC Children's Games for Peace Award
The PSC Children's Games for Peace Award were given to talented young athletes who are won medals in major age-group sports events including the Batang Pinoy and the Palarong Pambansa.

See also
2018 in Philippine sports
Siklab Atleta
PSA Athlete of the Year

References

2018 in Philippine sport
2018 sports awards